Telecom Development Company Afghanistan (TDCA) is a telecommunications consortium in Afghanistan. Its projects include Roshan (telco), the brand name for their GSM services. The consortium is led by Aga Khan Fund for Economic Development and consists of Monaco Telecom International and Telia Company.

See also
Communications in Afghanistan
Roshan (telco)

Telecommunications companies of Afghanistan